Angel Sandy Martínez Martínez (born October 8, 1970) is a Dominican former professional baseball player, and current Manager for the DSL Nationals. He played as a catcher in Major League Baseball for the Toronto Blue Jays (-), Chicago Cubs (-), Florida Marlins, Montreal Expos, Cleveland Indians, and Boston Red Sox (2004). He bats left-handed and throws right-handed.

Baseball career
He was traded to the Chicago Cubs on December 11, 1997, for minor leaguer Trevor Schaffer. Martínez was the battery-mate for Cubs pitcher Kerry Wood on May 6, 1998 when Wood struck out 20 batters to tie Roger Clemens for the major league single-game strikeout record in a 9 inning game. He posted a career-high batting average of .264 and made the only post-season appearance of his career where, he had one hit in one at bat and scored a run in Game 3 of the 1998 National League Division Series.

Martínez became a free agent after the 1999 season and signed with the Florida Marlins on December 6, 1999. A free agent at the end of the 2000 season, Martínez signed with the Montreal Expos on November 17, 2000. For the  season, Martínez signed with the Tampa Bay Devil Rays, but was released in spring training.

On April 8, 2003, he signed with the Kansas City Royals and played for their Triple-A affiliate, the Omaha Royals. After being released on June 8, 2003, Martínez signed with the Pittsburgh Pirates on January 20, 2004, but before playing a game for the Pirates, Martínez was traded to the Indians. He spent most of the season with Cleveland's Triple-A affiliate, the Buffalo Bisons, playing one game for the Indians major league team. On August 31, 2004, Martínez's contract was purchased by the Boston Red Sox, where he played three games before being granted free agency at the end of the season. He played in his final major league game on October 3, 2004 at the age of 33.

On January 15, 2005, he signed with the Detroit Tigers, playing 81 games for their Triple-A affiliate, the Toledo Mud Hens. On December 14, 2005, Martínez signed a minor league contract with the New York Mets, playing 85 games for their Triple-A affiliate, the Norfolk Tides, and becoming a free agent at the end of the season. On November 16, 2006, Martínez signed a minor league contract with the Los Angeles Dodgers, but did not play in any games for their organization before being released and signed by the Florida Marlins. Martínez played three games for their Triple-A affiliate, the Albuquerque Isotopes, and became a free agent at the end of the  season. For the 2008 season Martínez signed with the Orix Buffalos and played in 125 games batting just .219 but had 29 home runs a career high and 70 runs batted in.

Career statistics
In an eight-year major league career, Martínez played in 218 games, accumulating 130 hits in 564 at bats for a .230 career batting average along with 6 home runs, 51 runs batted in and a .284 on-base percentage. He ended his career with a .988 fielding percentage.

Managerial career
Martinez managed the Washington Nationals' affiliate in the Dominican Summer League during the 2010 season and was re-appointed manager of the DSL Nationals for 2011.

References

External links

1970 births
Living people
Albuquerque Isotopes players
Boston Red Sox players
Buffalo Bisons (minor league) players
Calgary Cannons players
Chicago Cubs players
Cleveland Indians players
Dominican Republic expatriate baseball players in Canada
Dominican Republic expatriate baseball players in the United States
Florida Marlins players
Hagerstown Suns players
Iowa Cubs players

Major League Baseball catchers
Major League Baseball players from the Dominican Republic
Minor league baseball managers
Montreal Expos players
Norfolk Tides players
Ottawa Lynx players
Omaha Royals players
People from Santo Domingo Norte
Toledo Mud Hens players
Toronto Blue Jays players